Lost Creek Dam (National ID # UT10125) is a dam in Morgan County, Utah, United States.

Description
It impounds Lost Creek for flood control, part of the Weber Basin Project. The dam is owned by the USBR and is operated by the local Weber Basin Water Conservancy District.

Lost Creek Reservoir
Recreation includes fishing (rainbow trout and cutthroat trout) and boating. Lost Creek State Park is nearby.

See also
 List of dams and reservoirs in Utah

References

Dams in Utah
Reservoirs in Utah
United States Bureau of Reclamation dams
Buildings and structures in Morgan County, Utah
Earth-filled dams
Dams completed in 1966
Lakes of Morgan County, Utah
1966 establishments in Utah